Tabuk, also spelled Tabouk, is a region of Saudi Arabia, located along the north-west coast of the country, facing Egypt across the Red Sea. It has an area of 146,072 km2 and a population of 910,030 (2017). Its capital is Tabuk. The governor is Fahd bin Sultan since 1987. In recent years, the province has received substantial media attention due to the Saudi government's futuristic Neom City project in the province.

History 

The history of the Tabuk region dates back to 5,000 years ago. The region is identified with the land of Madyan. The region is traversed by the Hejaz Railway, which was a focus for attacks during the Arab Revolt of 1916-1918.
The province has traditionally been inhabited by the Howeitat tribe.

Population

Major cities 
 Tabuk
 Tayma
 Duba
 Al Wajh
 Haql
 Umluj
 Al-Bad'
 Neom (Planned)
 Amaala (Planned)

Economy 
Tabuk is an active commercial center, serving pilgrims passing through towards Mecca. Due to its moderate climate, it's also the site of several dairy and poultry farms. The region (Astra) exports flowers to Europe, mainly lilies, statices and gladiolas. In the past, a narrow-gauge railway (1,050 mm / 3 ft 511⁄32 in track gauge) ran from Damascus to Medina through Tabuk. Remains of the railway can be found in Tabuk, where a large station was built. The station has since been restored.

List of governors
The governors of the region since 1926 are as follows:

 Muhammad ibn Abdulziz Alshahl from 1926 to 1930
 Abdullah bin Saad from 1930 to 1931
 Abdullah bin Saad bin Abdul Mohsen Al Sudairi from 1931 to 1935
 Saud bin Hizlol bin Nasser Al Saud from 1936 to 1937
 Musaed Saud bin Abdullah bin Abdulaziz Al Saud of 1938 to 1950
 Suleiman bin Mohammed bin Sultan Al Sultan from 1950 to 1950
 Abdul Rahman bin Mohammed from 1950 to 1951
 Khalid bin Ahmed bin Mohammed Al Sudairi from 1951 to 1955
 Musaad bin Ahmed bin Mohammed Al Sudairi from 1955 to 1972
 Sulaiman bin Turki bin Suleiman Al Sudairi from 1972 to 1980
 Abdul Majeed bin Abdulaziz Al Saud from 1980 to 1986
 Mamdouh bin Abdulaziz Al Saud from 1986 to 1987
 Fahd bin Sultan Al Saud, 1987–present

Destinations 
 The Fortress of Tabuk
 The Birds Garden 
 The Park of Prince Fahad bin Sultan

See also 

 Hejaz
 Hijaz Mountains
 List of cities and towns in Saudi Arabia

References

External links 
 The-Saudi.net on Tabouk
 Saudi Arabian Information Resource on Tabouk, with pictures 

 
Provinces of Saudi Arabia